Jim Robinson, also known as Big Jim Robinson (December 25, 1892 – May 4, 1976) was an American jazz musician, based in New Orleans, renowned for his deep, wide-toned, robust "tailgate" style of trombone playing, using the slide to achieve a wide swoop between two notes (a technique that classical musicians call "glissando") and rhythmic effects.

Early life 
Born Nathan Robinson in Deer Range, a small settlement on the west bank of lower Plaquemines Parish, Louisiana, Robinson studied music under James Brown Humphrey.

Career 
Robinson arrived in New Orleans looking for work shortly before the 1915 New Orleans hurricane, which wiped out his home town of Deer Range, and prompted Robinson to settle in the city. In his youth, he got the nickname "Jim Crow" because of his facial features, which resembled a Native American. He was playing professionally in his twenties, from World War I on. In the 1920s, he made his first recordings as a member of the Sam Morgan Jazz Band. He gained greater fame with the resurgence of interest in early New Orleans jazz starting in the 1940s as a regular member of the bands of Bunk Johnson and George Lewis. Occasionally, he also led his own band and appeared regularly at Preservation Hall in his later years.

Robinson's widely-recognized style was influential with many later traditional and New Orleans-style jazz trombonists in the United States and Europe. California trombonist Frank Demond assimilated Robinson’s style thoroughly and took his place in the Preservation Hall groups after Robinson’s death.  Robinson also tutored Big Bill Bissonnette. (The latter did not quite take, although Bissonnette did produce many recordings of the veteran musicians of New Orleans.)

Robinson's signature tune, "Ice Cream", was requested at almost all personal appearances after his virtuoso performance of the number in an American Music Records recording made in the 1940s. He also was known for promoting audience participation—especially encouraging dancing whenever feasible.

Personal life 
Jim Robinson died of cancer at the Touro Infirmary in New Orleans.

Discography
 New Orleans: The Living Legends (Riverside)
 Classic New Orleans Jazz Vol. 2 From The Rare Center Series (Biograph, 1993, 2007)

References

Jazz musicians from New Orleans
American jazz trombonists
Male trombonists
Riverside Records artists
People from Plaquemines Parish, Louisiana
1892 births
1976 deaths
Deaths from cancer in Louisiana
20th-century American musicians
20th-century trombonists
20th-century American male musicians
American male jazz musicians
Preservation Hall Jazz Band members
Tuxedo Brass Band members
Young Tuxedo Brass Band members
20th-century African-American musicians